Baleno, officially the Municipality of Baleno,  is a 4th class municipality in the province of Masbate, Philippines. According to the 2020 census, it has a population of 28,855 people.

History
Baleno was created as a municipality through Executive Order No. 244 signed by President Elpidio Quirino on July 18, 1949.

Geography

Barangays
Baleno is politically subdivided into 24 barangays.

Climate

Demographics

Economy

Points of Activity 
The Municipality of Baleno is a median town for provincial buses coming from Metro Manila and Bicol Region to various towns beyond Baleno, including Aroroy, Balud and Mandaon. Some of the notable bus liners that bypass the town are Isarog Bus Liners and Raymond Transportation.

Barangay Poblacion in Baleno is the seat of the Municipal Government, and includes a town plaza named Plaza Valdemoro. Its parochial church is heavily devoted to the Our Lady of Pillar a notable Christian figure in the Nueva Caceres (Archdiocese of Naga). The Municipality of Baleno has one Catholic school Liceo de Baleno under the roof of Diocese of Masbate and has several national-established high schools, namely Baleno National High School (Barangay Poblacion), Lagta National High School (Barangay Lagta), Lahong National High School (Barangay Lahong Proper), Magdalena National High School (Barangay Magdalena), and Amador-Bello High School (Barangay Gangao).

Aside from the prominence of Roman Catholicism in the locality and traces of sects and Christian groups such as Iglesia ni Kristo and Jehovah Witness, the municipality is the seat of the Congregation of Our Lady of Rocks Pilgrimage Church (Ina Poon Bato Simbahang Naglalakbay), considered as a Filipino Marian Catholic Church, wherein it holds to the belief of Mother Mary as the Third Person of the Holy Trinity. It is currently being handled by Santa Ma. Merly Amor as the Foundress and Matriarch of the Church, and Most. Rev. Ernesto Ignacio Maurice S. Nalzaro as the Patriarch and Protector of the Church.

References

External links
 
 [ Philippine Standard Geographic Code]
Philippine Census Information
Local Governance Performance Management System

Municipalities of Masbate
Establishments by Philippine executive order